Cajamarquilla District is one of ten districts of the Ocros Province in Peru.

See also 
 Kushuru Punta
 Shinwaqucha
 Yuraq Punta

References

Districts of the Ocros Province
Districts of the Ancash Region